The year 1998 in architecture involved some significant architectural events and new buildings.

Events
22 May–30 September – Expo '98 held in Lisbon, Portugal. It includes the Pavilion of Portugal designed by Álvaro Siza Vieira.
22 December – Park Hill, Sheffield, 1961 flatted public housing in South Yorkshire, England, is Grade II* listed, making it the largest listed building in Europe.

Buildings and structures

Buildings completed

5 April – Akashi Kaikyō Bridge, Japan, the longest suspension bridge in the world by the length of central span (1998–present), designed by Satoshi Kashima, opened.
16 April – City of Arts and Sciences, Valencia, Spain, designed by Santiago Calatrava and Félix Candela, inaugurated.
31 May – Saint Paul's Cathedral, Wellington, New Zealand, opened.
June – Jean-Marie Tjibaou Cultural Centre, New Caledonia, designed by Renzo Piano, opened.
6 July – Chek Lap Kok Airport in Hong Kong, designed by Norman Foster, opened.
15 October – Bellagio Hotel and Casino in Las Vegas, designed by Marnell Corrao Associates, opened.
 November – River and Rowing Museum, Henley-on-Thames, England, designed by David Chipperfield.
 Kiasma Museum of Contemporary Art, Helsinki, Finland, by Steven Holl Architects, opened.
 Gemäldegalerie, Berlin, Germany (in the Kulturforum), designed by Heinz Hilmer and Christoph Sattler, opened.
 Stadttor in Düsseldorf, Germany, designed by Karl-Heinz Petzinka, completed.
 Waterside (building) at Harmondsworth, England, international headquarters of the airline British Airways, designed by Niels Torp, opened.
 Lucerne Culture and Congress Centre in Switzerland, designed by Jean Nouvel, opened.
Jin Mao Building in Shanghai, designed by Skidmore, Owings & Merrill, completed.
Petronas Towers in Kuala Lumpur, designed by César Pelli, completed; it becomes the  tallest buildings in Malaysia (1998–present), tallest building in the British Commonwealth  (1998–2018) and tallest building in the world (1998–2004).
B 018 nightclub in Beirut, designed by Bernard Khoury.
 Polaria and the Polar Environment Centre in Tromsø, Norway
 North Woolwich pumping station in London Docklands, designed by Nicholas Grimshaw & Partners.
 Malator (earth house) in Wales, designed by Future Systems.

Awards
Alvar Aalto Medal – Steven Holl
Architecture Firm Award – Centerbrook Architects & Planners
Carlsberg Architectural Prize – Peter Zumthor
European Union Prize for Contemporary Architecture (Mies van der Rohe Prize) – Peter Zumthor for Kunsthaus Bregenz
Grand Prix de l'urbanisme – Christian Devillers
Grand prix national de l'architecture – Jacques Hondelatte
Praemium Imperiale Architecture Laureate – Álvaro Siza
Pritzker Prize – Renzo Piano
Prix de l'Équerre d'Argent – Rem Koolhaas
RAIA Gold Medal – Gabriel Poole
RIBA Royal Gold Medal – Oscar Niemeyer
Stirling Prize – Norman Foster and Partners, American Air Museum, Imperial War Museum, Duxford
Thomas Jefferson Medal in Architecture – Jaquelin T. Robertson.
Twenty-five Year Award – Kimbell Art Museum

Deaths
6 January – Francis Skinner, British architect (born 1908)
12 January – Marya Lilien, Polish-American architect (born 1900 or 1901)
13 June – Lúcio Costa, Brazilian architect and urban planner (born 1902)
29 August – Erik Asmussen, Danish-born architect (born 1913)
31 October – Rosemary Stjernstedt, British architect (born 1912)
14 November – Albert Frey, Californian "desert modernist" architect (born 1903)
24 November – Minnette de Silva, Sri Lankan modernist architect (born 1918)

References

 
20th-century architecture